Robert Joseph Sherlag (born April 19, 1943) is a former American football player who played for Atlanta Falcons of the National Football League (NFL). He played college football at the University of Memphis.

References

1943 births
Living people
Players of American football from Chicago
American football wide receivers
Memphis Tigers football players
Atlanta Falcons players